Matija Barl (17 February 1940 – 3 August 2018) was a Slovenian actor, producer and translator. In 1962 he founded and organized the first, oldest and most important Slovenian music festival called Slovenska popevka.

Biography
Barl was born in Ljubljana and lived around where he loved to play. When he was 11 years he went to the audition for the movie Kekec where he was chosen out of more than a thousand kids. He got the role of main character Kekec, a strong and fearless child superhero, for which he is best known today. Everyone identified him with this role so strongly that all the kids in real life wanted to fight with him. So he had to take classes for martial arts such as wrestling and judo.

Later he attended the Academy for Theatre, Radio, Film and Television in Ljubljana where he studied dramaturgy. In 1962 he moved to Germany where he worked as independent producer, translator and occasional actor. He lived in Marezige, Slovenia.

Work 
Barl is best known for playing role of the Kekec character. He also wrote lyrics for songs of important Slovenian music artists, work as producer, performing in documentary. His works are:

 Kekec (1951) - actor
 Schwarz und weiß wie Tage und Nächte (TV movie, 1978) - actor
 Pozabljeni zaklad (2006) - actor
 Madame Pompadour (TV movie, 1974) - unit manager
 Schwarz und weiß wie Tage und Nächte (TV movie, 1978) - production leader
 Zgodba gospoda P.F. (documentary, 2002) - composer
  (TV movie, 1982) - producer
 Der verliebte Teufel (TV movie, 1971) - assistant director
 Monty Python's Fliegender Zirkus (TV movie, 1971) - location manager

References

External links

1940 births
2018 deaths
Actors from Ljubljana
Slovenian male film actors
Slovenian composers
Male composers
Slovenian translators
University of Ljubljana alumni
20th-century Slovenian male actors
20th-century translators
Male child actors
Slovenian male musicians